Edmondson-Woodward House is a historic plantation house located near Stantonsburg, Wilson County, North Carolina.  It was built about 1830, and is a two-story, three bay, single pile, "L"-plan, Federal style frame dwelling.  It has a two-story wing added in the mid-19th century, side gable roof, exterior end chimneys, and hipped-roof porch with flared columns.

It was listed on the National Register of Historic Places in 1986.

References

Plantation houses in North Carolina
Houses on the National Register of Historic Places in North Carolina
Federal architecture in North Carolina
Houses completed in 1830
Houses in Wilson County, North Carolina
National Register of Historic Places in Wilson County, North Carolina